Carlos Páez may refer to:

 Carlos Páez Vilaró (1923–2014), Uruguayan artist
 Carlos Páez Rodríguez, his son, one of the sixteen survivors of Uruguayan Air Force Flight 571
 Carlos Páez (footballer) (born 1998), footballer from Colombia 
 Carlos Páez (volleyball) (born 1991), Venezuelan volleyball player in 2010 Men's Pan-American Volleyball Cup squads